Konrad Corradi, originally Johann Corradi, (2 September 1813, Oberneunforn - 9 April 1878, Laufen-Uhwiesen) was a Swiss landscape painter, illustrator and gouache artist.

Life and work 

In 1821, he began a six-year apprenticeship at the studios of  Johann Heinrich Bleuler, the Younger (1787–1857) in Feuerthalen, which he completed in 1827. From 1833, he worked at the painting school and publishing house operated by Bleuler's brother, Johann Ludwig, at Schloss Laufen.

In 1837, he went to Meiringen, where he made the acquaintance of Johann Wilhelm Schirmer, who introduced him to oil painting. The following year, he married Elisabeth Egli from Uhwiesen, where he eventually settled; although he travelled extensively in the summer, until he became too infirm.

In 1863, he was a co-founder of the Schweizer Alpen-Club.

Sources 
 Robert Pfaff: Die Bleuler Malschule auf Schloss Laufen am Rheinfall, Verlag Kuhn-Druck, 1985.

External links 

 More works by Corradi @ ArtNet

1813 births
1878 deaths
Swiss painters
Swiss landscape painters
Swiss illustrators
People from Frauenfeld District